ReCharge Collectible Card Game is an out-of-print collectible card game (CCG) based on Marvel Superheroes and produced by Marvel Entertainment in 2001. The game is modeled after Wizards of the Coast's X-Men Trading Card Game. It was subsumed by UpperDeck's Vs. System, which is still the torch-bearer as the main Marvel CCG.

Product releases
Two sets of ReCharge were released, called Series 1 (a.k.a. "Inaugural Edition") and Series 2. However, the cards between the sets are almost identical.

Reviews
Pyramid

References

External links
 Recharge Series 1 Checklist
 Recharge Series 2 Checklist

Card games introduced in 2001
Collectible card games based on Marvel Comics